There are over 20,000 Grade II* listed buildings in England. This page is a list of these buildings in the district of Forest of Dean in Gloucestershire.

Forest of Dean

|}

Notes

External links

Forest of Dean
 
Lists of Grade II* listed buildings in Gloucestershire